Numaykoos Lake Provincial Park was designated a provincial park by the Government of Manitoba in 1995. The park is considered to be a Class Ib protected area under the IUCN protected area management categories.

See also
List of protected areas of Manitoba

References

External links
Find Your Favorite Park: Numaykoos Lake Provincial Park

Provincial parks of Manitoba
Protected areas of Manitoba